Trojan Gundulić (c. 1500 - c. 1555) was a merchant and printer from the Republic of Ragusa who is remembered for his participation in the Belgrade printing house, The Four Gospels ("Četverojevanđelje").

Life

Trojan was born in the town of Dubrovnik in the Republic of Ragusa (modern-day Croatia) into the Gondola family (Gundulić), which was a Ragusan noble family of Italian origins. Gundulić started as a barber in his hometown and remained in this trade after his arrival to Ottoman-held Belgrade (modern-day Serbia). He later went into the trade business, which enabled him to finance the printing of books.  A large printing shop was established in Gundulić's house after he learned the printing trade from his mentor Radiša Dmitrović. Gundulić continued the work on Četverojevanđelje started by Radiša Dmitrović, who died early. In his turn, Gundulić passed the work to Hieromonk Mardarije of Mrkšina Crkva Monastery, an experienced printer. According to some sources, it was Hieromonk Mardarije who inspired first Dmitrović and then Gundulić to invest in printing business and organized all activities during set up of the printing house in Belgrade.

After the death of Gundulić in Belgrade c. 1555, 121 printed books were found in his house, including 59 copies of the Gospels.

See also
 List of notable Ragusans
 Andrija Paltašić (c. 1450–c. 1500), a Venetian printer from Kotor
Božidar Vuković
Božidar Goraždanin
Đurađ Crnojević
Stefan Marinović
Stefan Paštrović
Hieromonk Makarije
Hieromonk Mardarije
Hegumen Mardarije
Vićenco Vuković
Hieromonk Pahomije
Andrija Paltašić
Jakov of Kamena Reka
Bartolomeo Ginammi who followed Zagurović's footsteps reprinting Serbian books.
Dimitrije Ljubavić
Inok Sava

References

Further reading
 

Croatian printers
Serbian printers
Ragusan printers
Year of birth uncertain
Trojan
16th-century Croatian people
16th-century Serbian people
Businesspeople from Belgrade
16th-century merchants
16th-century printers
1500 births
1555 deaths